James Hillier (born 22 September 1973 in Kent, England) is a British actor and director. He played Sergeant Christian Young on the BBC police drama HolbyBlue, and Damian, Roxy Mitchell's fiancé in the BBC1 soap opera EastEnders. More recently, he appeared in the first and second seasons of the Netflix series The Crown, and on stage at the Royal Court Theatre in Torn.

Life and career
Hillier was born in Kent to Anthony and Susan Hillier as the eldest of three boys. He studied English literature at King's College and then went on to train at RADA from where he went straight into the prestigious BBC production of Great Expectations. His stage work includes Lulu at the Almeida, The Homecoming at The Royal Exchange, the British premiere of Tennessee Williams' Something Cloudy, Something Clear and Blue Surge by Rebecca Gilman for which he was nominated for a Best Male Performer Award. Hillier is artistic director of theatre company Defibrillator for whom he has directed Sam Shepard's A Lie of the Mind, Terry Johnson's Insignificance,  The Hotel Plays and Hard Feelings. His longtime partner Amy and their two boys live in London. He is a keen sportsman and avid sports fan, following Tottenham Hotspur FC.

Filmography

External links

References

Alumni of King's College London
Alumni of RADA
Living people
1973 births
People educated at Maidstone Grammar School
English male television actors
English male film actors
Male actors from Kent